Arthur Pohl (1900–1970) was a German screenwriter and film director.

Selected filmography

Director
 The Bridge (1949)
 Die Jungen vom Kranichsee (1950)
 Corinna Schmidt (1951)
 Die Unbesiegbaren (1953)
 Kein Hüsung (1954)
 Pole Poppenspäler (1954)
 Spielbank-Affäre (1957)
 Das Haus voller Gäste (1960, TV film)
 Kleine Geschäfte (1962, TV film)
 Randbezirk (1963, TV film)

Screenwriter
 Twilight (1940)
 Street Acquaintances (1948)

References

External links
 

1900 births
1970 deaths
Mass media people from Saxony
People from Görlitz